Probolodus heterostomus is a species of characin endemic to Brazil, where it is found in the basins of the southeastern coastal rivers.

References

Characidae
Fish of South America
Fish of Brazil
Endemic fauna of Brazil
Taxa named by Carl H. Eigenmann
Fish described in 1911